Dans ma bulle is a 2006 album recorded by the French artist Diam's.

It was the best-selling album of 2006 in France.

Track listing
 "Introduction" (Diam's, DJ Maître, Elio, Tefa) – 1:11
 "La Boulette (génération nan nan)" (Diam's, DJ Maître, Elio, Skread, Tefa) – 3:51
 "Ma France à moi" (Gregory Berthou, Diam's, Tyran) – 4:33
 "Feuille blanche" (Diam's, DJ Maître, Elio, Tefa) – 5:19
 "Jeune Demoiselle" (Diam's, Dr Swing, Yann Le Men, Luke) – 4:41
 "Car tu portes mon nom" (Diam's, DJ Maître, Tefa) – 5:40
 "Marine" (Diam's, DJ Maître, Tefa) – 5:40
 "Dans ma bulle" (Diam's, Skread) – 5:15
 "Par Amour" (Diam's) – 6:43
 "Big Up" (Diam's, Street Fabulous) – 5:32
 "Confessions nocturnes" (Diam's, DJ Maître, Elio, Tefa, Vitaa) – 6:00
 "T.S." (Diam's, DJ Maître, Tefa) – 4:32
 "Me Revoilà" (Bardelivien, Brown, Charden, Diam's, Matteoni, Zeano) – 4:46
 "Cause à effet" (Diam's, DJ Maître, Tefa) – 5:19
 "Petite banlieusarde" (Diam's, Skread) – 6:51

Personnel 

Jerome Albertini – Photography
Chris Athens – Mastering
Amel Bent – Choeurs
Jean Francois Delort – Mixing
Pierrick Devin – Assistant
Jean Pierre Dréau – Engineer, Assistant
Marc Guéroult – Assistant
Richard Huredia – Mixing
Slim Pezin – Guitar

Charts

References

Diam's albums
2006 albums
French-language albums
Albums produced by Skread